The Denver Museum of Miniatures, Dolls and Toys is a private, non-profit museum that is located in Lakewood, Colorado.

The museum was founded in 1981. In 1987, the museum opened at its first location in cooperation with the Colorado Historical Society within the Pearce-McAllister Cottage. The collection of the museum includes more than 20,000 objects dating from 1680 onwards. In 2020, the Museum moved to its new location in Lakewood, Colorado. Its address is 830 Kipling St. Lakewood, Colorado 80215.

See also 
 List of museums in Colorado

References 

https://denverite.com/2020/07/29/a-very-close-look-at-the-very-small-homes-contained-in-the-reborn-denver-dollhouse-museum/
https://www.westword.com/location/denver-museum-of-miniatures-dolls-and-toys-5162992

External links 

 Denver Museum of Miniatures, Dolls and Toys website
 TripAdvisor information

Museums established in 1981
Museums in Jefferson County, Colorado
Toy museums in the United States
History Colorado
Doll museums
1981 establishments in Colorado